The first USS Northampton (SP-670), was a wooden motor boat acquired by the United States Navy for patrol duty during World War I.

Northampton was built by Wilson of Birdsnest, Virginia, and was acquired by the U.S. Navy on free lease from John A. Parsons of Norfolk, Virginia, on 5 May 1917.

Northampton was assigned to the 5th Naval District. She operated on section patrol until returned to her owner on 19 December 1918.

Notes

References

External links
 Photo gallery at Navsource.org

World War I patrol vessels of the United States
Patrol vessels of the United States Navy
Ships built in Norfolk, Virginia